{{DISPLAYTITLE:C11H8O2}}
The molecular formula C11H8O2 (molar mass: 172.18 g/mol, exact mass: 172.0524 u) may refer to:

 1-Naphthoic acid
 2-Naphthoic acid
 Menadione

Chemical formulas